Petero Mataca  (28 April 1933 – 30 June 2014) born at Cawaci, on Ovalau Island, served as the Roman Catholic archbishop of Suva, Fiji until his resignation in 2012.

Biography
After his education at St. John's College, Cawaci, he was ordained as a priest on 20 December 1959. He was named a bishop on 3 December 1974 when he was appointed titular bishop of Siminina and auxiliary bishop of Suva; following his appointment as a bishop, he was consecrated the same year. On 10 April 1976, he was appointed archbishop of Suva. On 19 December 2012, his resignation was accepted by Pope Benedict XVI. He died on 30 June 2014 at the Suva Private Hospital after a long illness.

Political positions
Mataca was a critic of some government policies, including its proposal to establish a Reconciliation and Unity Commission with the power, subject to presidential approval, to compensate victims and pardon perpetrators of the 2000 Fijian coup d'état that deposed the elected government of Prime Minister Mahendra Chaudhry in 2000.   
   
On 22 June 2005, Mataca accused Prime Minister Laisenia Qarase of having misled church leaders about the provisions of the legislation to establish the Commission. Mataca and the leaders of a number of other denominations, he said, had been summoned to the Prime Minister's office on 2 May where they had been told about the bill's reconciliation and compensation provisions, which they had heartily endorsed. Only later, through the media, did they learn about its amnesty provisions.    
   
Mataca said he did not support the concept of amnesty for persons convicted of political crimes. The overthrow of a democratically elected government a serious crime, he said, and "the coup cycle" would continue unless those involved faced the consequences of their crimes. "I publicly appeal to our President, our Prime Minister and the members of our Government to withdraw the Bill until such time as proper consultations can be held and appropriate amendments made," Mataca said. Reconciliation and unity could not come from a politically motivated bill, he warned. On the contrary, he saw reconciliation as a healing process that must start with truth telling, confession of wrongdoing, genuine request for forgiveness and willingness to accept the consequences of one's actions. "It seems ... that the Bill has been hastily put together for political purposes - especially in view of the elections next year," Mataca said. "This is not in the interests of the country and any stubborn effort by the Government to push through this Bill will be counter productive and will threaten Fiji's future stability."    
   
Not all Catholics agreed with Mataca. In a parliamentary submission on 30 June, Vice-President Kelepi Lesi of the Catholic League described the bill as a healing process between two parties, and very much in line with the moral principles taught by the Catholic Church.

View of Christian political activism
In an article written for the Fiji Sun on 12 January 2006, Mataca condemned voices, who claimed to be Christian, who advocated proclaiming Fiji a Christian state, banning other religions, condemning homosexuality, and requiring leadership positions to be reserved for approved Christians. He called for what he called "authentic Christian voices" to speak up, and for the true path of Jesus to be followed.    
   
Writing an editorial in the Fiji Sun on 6 March 2006, Mataca called on Christians to avoid getting caught up in ethnic politics in the upcoming election due on 6–13 May, and said that calls for Christians to mobilize politically against others was contrary to the teaching and example of Jesus.

2006 coup d'état
 
  
In the wake of the military coup which deposed the civilian government of Prime Minister Laisenia Qarase on 5 December 2006, Mataca took a more nuanced position than the leaders of many other denominations, and refused to endorse a statement put out by the Assembly of Christian Churches (ACCF) and the Fiji Council of Churches (FCC), which described the Fijian Military, commanded by Commodore Frank Bainimarama, as "manifestations of darkness and evil." Mataca said that such a stance was hypocritical, as the organizations had failed to condemn the previous coup of 2000. In a letter to the Fiji Sun on 10 December, he condemned the coup, but also claimed that the government had pursued policies that had led to it.

Mataca was co-chairman, along with Commodore Bainimarama, of the National Council for Building a Better Fiji.

Social views
On 6 January 2006, the Fiji Sun quoted Mataca as calling on people to "respect, protect, and preserve" family values. He condemned Fiji's high divorce rate, and criticized legislation which facilitated it.

Death
Mataca died at the Suva Private Hospital after a long illness on 30 June 2014.

References

   

1933 births
2014 deaths
People from Ovalau (Fiji)
Companions of the Order of Fiji
Fijian Roman Catholics
Fijian Roman Catholic archbishops
20th-century Roman Catholic archbishops in Oceania
21st-century Roman Catholic archbishops in Oceania
Roman Catholic archbishops of Suva